Vinayak Damodar Savarkar, Marathi pronunciation: [ʋinaːjək saːʋəɾkəɾ]; also commonly known as Veer Savarkar (28 May 1883 – 26 February 1966), was an Indian politician, activist, and writer.

Savarkar developed the Hindu nationalist political ideology of Hindutva while imprisoned at Ratnagiri in 1922. He was a leading figure in the Hindu Mahasabha. He started using the honorific prefix Veer meaning "brave" since he wrote his autobiography.

Savarkar joined the Hindu Mahasabha and popularized the term Hindutva (Hinduness), previously coined by Chandranath Basu, to create a collective "Hindu" identity as an essence of Bharat (India). Savarkar was an atheist but a pragmatic practitioner of Hindu philosophy.

Savarkar began his political activities as a high school student and continued to do so at Fergusson College in Pune. He and his brother founded a secret society called Abhinav Bharat Society. When he went to the United Kingdom for his law studies, he involved himself with organizations such as India House and the Free India Society. He also published books advocating complete Indian independence by revolutionary means. One of the books he published called The Indian War of Independence about the Indian Rebellion of 1857 was banned by the British colonial authorities.

In 1910, Savarkar was arrested and ordered to be extradited to India for his connections with the revolutionary group India House. On the voyage back to India, Savarkar staged an attempt to escape jumping from steamship SS Morea and seek asylum in France while the ship was docked in the port of Marseilles. The French port officials however handed him back to the British government. On return to India, Savarkar was sentenced to life terms of imprisonment totaling fifty years and was moved to the Cellular Jail in the Andaman and Nicobar Islands.

He was released in 1924 by the British officials after he wrote a series of mercy petitions to the British. He virtually stopped any criticism of the British regime after he was released from jail.

After 1937, he started traveling widely, becoming a forceful orator and writer, advocating Hindu political and social unity. In 1938, he was a president of Marathi Sahitya Sammelan in Mumbai. Serving as the president of the Hindu Mahasabha, Savarkar endorsed the idea of India as a Hindu Rashtra (Hindu Nation). Savarkar assured the Sikhs that "when the Muslims woke from their day-dreams of Pakistan, they would see established instead a Sikhistan in the Punjab." Savarkar not only talked of Hindudom, Hindu Nation and Hindu Raj, but he wanted to depend upon the Sikhs in the Punjab to establish a Sikhistan.

By 1939, Savarkar committed an alliance with the Muslim League in 1939 after both were decimated by the Indian National Congress. He also supported the two-nation theory. He was openly critical of the decision taken by the Congress working committee in its Wardha session of 1942 to a resolution which said to the British colonial government: "Quit India but keep your armies here", which was intended to defend India against a possible Japanese invasion. In July 1942, as he felt extremely stressed carrying out his duties as the president of Hindu Mahasabha, and as he needed some rest, he resigned from the post, the timing of which coincided with Gandhi's Quit India Movement.

In 1948, Savarkar was charged as a co-conspirator in the assassination of Mahatma Gandhi; however, he was acquitted by the court for lack of evidence.

Life and career

Early life 
Vinayak Damodar Savarkar was born on 28 May 1883 in the Marathi Chitpavan Brahmin Hindu family of Damodar and Radhabai Savarkar in the village of Bhagur, near the city of Nashik, Maharashtra. He had three other siblings namely Ganesh, Narayan, and a sister named Maina. Savarkar began his  activism as a high school student. When he was 12, he led fellow students in an attack on his village mosque following Hindu-Muslim riots, stating: "We vandalized the mosque to our heart's content." In 1903, in Nashik, Savarkar and his older brother Ganesh Savarkar founded the Mitra Mela, an underground revolutionary organization, which became Abhinav Bharat Society in 1906. Abhinav Bharat's main objectives were to overthrow British rule and reviving Hindu pride.

Student activist
Savarkar continued his political activism as a student at Fergusson College in Pune.
Savarkar was greatly influenced by the radical Nationalist leader, Lokmanya Tilak. Tilak was in turn impressed with the young student and helped him obtain the Shivaji Scholarship in 1906 for his law studies in London.

London years
In London, he involved himself with organizations such as India House and the Free India Society. He also published books advocating complete Indian independence by revolutionary means. One of the books he published called The Indian War of Independence about the Indian Rebellion of 1857 was banned by the British colonial authorities.

Savarkar was influenced by the life and thinking of Italian Nationalist leader, Giuseppe Mazzini. During his stay in London, Savarkar translated Mazzini's biography in Marathi. He also influenced thinking of a fellow student called Madanlal Dhingra. In 1909, Dhingra assassinated Curzon-Wylie, a colonial officer. It is alleged by Mark Juergensmeyer that Savarkar supplied the gun which Dhingra used. Juergensmeyer further alleges that Savarkar supplied the words for Dhingra's last statement before he went to the gallows for the murder. Savarkar met Mohandas Gandhi for the first time in London shortly after Curzon-Wylie's assassination. During his stay, Gandhi debated Savarkar and other nationalists in London on the futility of fighting the colonial state through acts of terrorism and guerilla warfare.

Arrest and transportation to India 
In India, Ganesh Savarkar had organized an armed revolt against the Morley-Minto reforms of 1909. Savarkar was accused of participating in a conspiracy to overthrow the British government in India by organizing murders of various officials. Hoping to evade arrest, Savarkar moved to Bhikaiji Cama's home in Paris, but against advice from his friends, returned to London. On 13 March 1910, he was arrested in London on multiple charges, including procurement and distribution of arms, waging war against the state, and delivering seditious speeches. At the time of his arrest, he was carrying several revolutionary texts, including copies of his own banned books. In addition, the British government had evidence that he had smuggled 20 Browning handguns into India, one of which Anant Laxman Kanhere used to assassinate the British official A.M.T. Jackson in December 1909.

Although his alleged crimes were committed both in Britain, as well as India, the British authorities decided to try him in India. He was accordingly put on the commercial ship Morea with a police escort for his transport to India. When the ship docked in the French Mediterranean port of Marseille, Savarkar escaped by jumping from the ship's window, swam to the French shore, and asked for political asylum. The French port officials ignored his pleas, and handed him back to his British captors. When the French government came to know of this incidence, they asked for Savarkar to be brought back to France, and lodged an appeal with the Permanent Court of Arbitration.

French Case before the Permanent Court of Arbitration 

Savarkar's arrest at Marseilles caused the French government to protest against the British, arguing that the British could not recover Savarkar unless they took appropriate legal proceedings for his rendition. The dispute came before the Permanent Court of International Arbitration in 1910, and it gave its decision in 1911. The case excited much controversy as was reported widely by the French press, and it considered it involved an interesting international question of the right of asylum.

The Court held, firstly, that since there was a pattern of collaboration between the two countries regarding the possibility of Savarkar's escape in Marseilles and there was neither force nor fraud in inducing the French authorities to return Savarkar to them, the British authorities did not have to hand him back to the French for the latter to hold rendition proceedings. On the other hand, the tribunal also observed that there had been an "irregularity" in Savarkar's arrest and delivery over to the Indian Army Military Police guard.

Trial and sentence 
Arriving in Bombay, Savarkar was taken to the Yervada Central Jail in Pune. The trial before the special tribunal was started on 10 September 1910. One of the charges on Savarkar was the abetment to murder of Nashik Collector A. M. T. Jackson. The second was waging a conspiracy under Indian penal code 121-A against the King Emperor. Following the two trials, Savarkar, then aged 28, was convicted and sentenced to 50-years imprisonment and transported on 4 July 1911 to the infamous Cellular Jail in the Andaman and Nicobar Islands. He was considered by the British government as a political prisoner.

Prisoner in Andaman

Clemency Petitions

1911
Savarkar applied to the Bombay Government for certain concessions in connection with his sentences. However, by Government letter No. 2022, dated 4 April 1911, his application was rejected and he was informed that the question of remitting the second sentence of transportation for life would be considered in due course on the expiry of the first sentence of transportation for life. A month after arriving in the Cellular Jail, Andaman and Nicobar Islands, Savarkar submitted his first clemency petition on 30 August 1911. This petition was rejected on 3 September 1911.

1913
Savarkar submitted his next clemency petition on 14 November 1913 and presented it personally to the Home Member of the Governor General's council, Sir Reginald Craddock. In his letter, he described himself as a "prodigal son" longing to return to the "parental doors of the government". He wrote that his release from the jail will recast the faith of many Indians in the British rule. Also, he said "Moreover, my conversion to the constitutional line would bring back all those misled young men in India and abroad who were once looking up to me as their guide. I am ready to serve the government in any capacity they like, for as my conversion is conscientious so I hope my future conduct would be. By keeping me in jail, nothing can be got in comparison to what would be otherwise."

1917
In 1917, Savarkar submitted another clemency petition, this time for a general amnesty of all political prisoners. Savarkar was informed on 1 February 1918 that the clemency petition was placed before the British colonial government. In December 1919, there was a Royal proclamation by King-Emperor George V. The Paragraph 6 of this proclamation included a declaration of Royal clemency to political offenders. In view of Royal proclamation, Savarkar submitted his fourth clemency petition to the British colonial government on 30 March 1920, in which he stated that "So far from believing in the militant school of the Bukanin type, I do not contribute even to the peaceful and philosophical anarchism of a Kuropatkin [sic.] or a Tolstoy. And as to my revolutionary tendencies in the past:- it is not only now for the object of sharing the clemency but years before this have I informed of and written to the Government in my petitions (1918, 1914) about my firm intention to abide by the constitution and stand by it as soon as a beginning was made to frame it by Mr. Montagu. Since that the Reforms and then the Proclamation have only confirmed me in my views and recently I have publicly avowed my faith in and readiness to stand by the side of orderly and constitutional development."

This petition was rejected on 12 July 1920 by the British colonial government. After considering the petition, the British colonial government contemplated releasing Ganesh Savarkar but not Vinayak Savarkar. The rationale for doing so was stated as follows

Savarkar signed a statement endorsing his trial, verdict, and British law, and renouncing violence, a bargain for freedom.

Ratnagiri years under restricted freedom
On 2 May 1921, the Savarkar brothers were moved to a jail in Ratnagiri. During his incarceration in Ratnagiri jail in 1922, he wrote his "Essentials of Hindutva" that formulated his theory of Hindutva. On 6 January 1924 was released but confined to Ratnagiri District. Soon after he started working on the consolidation of Hindu society or Hindu Sangathan. The colonial authorities provided a bungalow for him and he was allowed, visitors. During his internment, he met influential people such as Mahatma Gandhi, and Dr. Ambedkar. Nathuram Godse, who later on in his life assassinated Gandhi, also met Savarkar for the first time as a nineteen-year-old in 1929. Savarkar became a prolific writer during his years of confinement in Ratnagiri. His publishers, however, needed to have a disclaimer that they were wholly divorced from politics. Savarkar remained confined to Ratnagiri district until 1937. At that time, he was unconditionally released by the newly elected government of Bombay presidency.

Leader of the Hindu Mahasabha 
Savarkar as president of the Hindu Mahasabha, during the Second World War, advanced the slogan "Hinduize all Politics and Militarize Hindudom" and decided to support the British war effort in India seeking military training for the Hindus. When the Congress launched the Quit India movement in 1942, Savarkar criticised it and asked Hindus to stay active in the war effort and not disobey the government; he also urged the Hindus to enlist in the armed forces to learn the "arts of war". Hindu Mahasabha activists protested Gandhi's initiative to hold talks with Jinnah in 1944, which Savarkar denounced as "appeasement". He assailed the British proposals for transfer of power, attacking both the Congress and the British for making concessions to Muslim separatists. Soon after independence, Syama Prasad Mookerjee resigned as vice-president of the Hindu Mahasabha dissociating himself from its Akhand Hindustan (Undivided India) plank, which implied undoing partition.

Opposition to Quit India Movement 
Under Savarkar, the Hindu Mahasabha openly opposed the call for the Quit India Movement and boycotted it officially. Savarkar even went to the extent of writing a letter titled "Stick to your Posts", in which he instructed Hindu Sabhaites who happened to be "members of municipalities, local bodies, legislatures or those serving in the army ... to stick to their posts" across the country, and not to join the Quit India Movement at any cost.

Alliance with Muslim League and others 
The Indian National Congress won a massive victory in the 1937 Indian provincial elections, decimating the Muslim League and the Hindu Mahasabha. However, in 1939, the Congress ministries resigned in protest against Viceroy Lord Linlithgow's action of declaring India to be a belligerent in the Second World War without consulting the Indian people. This led to the Hindu Mahasabha, under Savarkar's presidency, joining hands with the Muslim League and other parties to form governments, in certain provinces. Such coalition governments were formed in Sindh, NWFP, and Bengal.

In Sindh, Hindu Mahasabha members joined Ghulam Hussain Hidayatullah's Muslim League government. In Savarkar's own words,"Witness the fact that only recently in Sind, the Sind-Hindu-Sabha on invitation had taken the responsibility of joining hands with the League itself in running coalition government
In the North West Frontier Province, Hindu Mahasabha members joined hands with Sardar Aurangzeb Khan of the Muslim League to form a government in 1943. The Mahasabha member of the cabinet was Finance Minister Mehar Chand Khanna.

In Bengal, Hindu Mahasabha joined the Krishak Praja Party led Progressive Coalition ministry of Fazlul Haq in December 1941. Savarkar appreciated the successful functioning of the coalition government.

Arrest and acquittal in Gandhi's assassination 

Following the assassination of Gandhi on 30 January 1948, police arrested the assassin Nathuram Godse and his alleged accomplices and conspirators. He was a member of the Hindu Mahasabha and of the Rashtriya Swayamsevak Sangh. Godse was the editor of Agrani – Hindu Rashtra, a Marathi daily from Pune which was run by the company "The Hindu Rashtra Prakashan Ltd" (The Hindu Nation Publications). This company had contributions from such eminent persons as Gulabchand Hirachand, Bhalji Pendharkar, and Jugalkishore Birla. Savarkar had invested  15000 in the company. Savarkar, a former president of the Hindu Mahasabha, was arrested on 5 February 1948, from his house in Shivaji Park, and kept under detention in the Arthur Road Prison, Bombay. He was charged with murder, conspiracy to murder, and abetment to murder. A day before his arrest, Savarkar in a public written statement, as reported in The Times of India, Bombay dated 7 February 1948, termed Gandhi's assassination a fratricidal crime, endangering India's existence as a nascent nation. The mass of papers seized from his house had revealed nothing that could remotely be connected with Gandhi's murder. Due to lack of evidence, Savarkar was arrested under the Preventive Detention Act.

Badge's testimony 
Godse claimed full responsibility for planning and carrying out the assassination. However, according to the Approver Digambar Badge, on 17 January 1948, Nathuram Godse went to have a last darshan (audience/interview) with Savarkar in Bombay before the assassination. While Badge and Shankar waited outside, Nathuram and Apte went in. On coming out Apte told Badge that Savarkar blessed them "Yashasvi houn ya" ("यशस्वी होऊन या", be successful and return). Apte also said that Savarkar predicted that Gandhi's 100 years were over and there was no doubt that the task would be successfully finished. However Badge's testimony was not accepted as the approver's evidence lacked independent corroboration and hence Savarkar was acquitted.

In the last week of August 1974, Mr. Manohar Malgonkar saw Digamber Badge several times and in particular, questioned him about the veracity of his testimony against Savarkar. Badge insisted to Mr. Manohar Malgonkar that "even though he had blurted out the full story of the plot as far as he knew, without much persuasion, he had put up a valiant struggle against being made to testify against Savarkar". In the end, Badge gave in. He agreed to say on oath that he saw Nathuram Godse and Apte with Savarkar and that Savarkar, within Badge's hearing, had blessed their venture.

Kapur commission 

On 12 November 1964, at a religious program organized in Pune to celebrate the release of Gopal Godse, Madanlal Pahwa and Vishnu Karkare from jail after the expiry of their sentences, Dr. G. V. Ketkar, grandson of Bal Gangadhar Tilak, former editor of Kesari and then editor of "Tarun Bharat", who presided over the function, gave information of a conspiracy to kill Gandhi, about which he professed knowledge six months before the act. Ketkar was arrested. A public furor ensued both outside and inside the Maharashtra Legislative Assembly and both houses of the Indian parliament. Under the pressure of 29 members of parliament and public opinion the then Union home minister Gulzarilal Nanda appointed Gopal Swarup Pathak, M. P. and a senior advocate of the Supreme Court of India as a Commission of Inquiry to re-investigate the conspiracy to murder Gandhi. The central government intended on conducting a thorough inquiry with the help of old records in consultation with the government of Maharashtra. Pathak was given three months to conduct his inquiry; subsequently, Jevanlal Kapur, a retired judge of the Supreme Court of India, was appointed chairman of the commission.

The commission's reinvestigation saw Savarkar's secretary and bodyguard to have testified that Savarkar met with Godse and Apte right before Gandhi was killed.

The commission was provided with evidence not produced in the court; especially the testimony of two of Savarkar's close aides – Appa Ramachandra Kasar, his bodyguard, and Gajanan Vishnu Damle, his secretary. The testimony of Mr. Kasar and Mr. Damle was already recorded by Bombay police on 4 March 1948, but apparently, these testimonies were not presented before the court during the trial. In these testimonies, it is said that Godse and Apte visited Savarkar on or about 23 or 24 January, which was when they returned from Delhi after the bomb incident. Damle deposed that Godse and Apte saw Savarkar in the middle of January and sat with him (Savarkar) in his garden. The C. I. D. Bombay was keeping vigil on Savarkar from 21 to 30 January 1948. The crime report from C. I. D. does not mention Godse or Apte meeting Savarkar during this time.

Justice Kapur concluded: "All these facts taken together were destructive of any theory other than the conspiracy to murder by Savarkar and his group."

The arrest of Savarkar was mainly based on approver Digambar Badge's testimony. The commission did not re-interview Digambar Badge. At the time of inquiry of the commission, Badge was alive and working in Bombay.

Later years 
After Gandhi's assassination, Savarkar's home in Dadar, Bombay was stoned by angry mobs. After he was acquitted of the allegations related to Gandhi's assassination and released from jail, Savarkar was arrested by the government for making "Hindu nationalist speeches"; he was released after agreeing to give up political activities. He continued addressing the social and cultural elements of Hindutva. He resumed political activism after the ban on it was lifted; it was however limited until his death in 1966 because of ill health.

In 1956, he opposed B. R. Ambedkar's conversion to Buddhism calling it a "useless act", to which Ambedkar responded by publicly questioning the use of epithet ‘Veer’ (meaning brave) used by Savarkar.

Death 
On 8 November 1963, Savarkar's wife, Yamunabai, died. On 1 February 1966, Savarkar renounced medicines, food, and water which he termed as atmaarpan (fast until death). Before his death, he had written an article titled "Atmahatya Nahi Atmaarpan" in which he argued that when one's life mission is over and the ability to serve society is left no more, it is better to end the life at will rather than waiting for death. His condition was described to have become as "extremely serious" before his death on 26 February 1966 at his residence in Bombay (now Mumbai), and that he faced difficulty in breathing; efforts to revive him failed, and was declared dead at 11:10 a.m. (IST) that day. Prior to his death, Savarkar had asked his relatives to perform only his funeral and do away with the rituals of the 10th and 13th day of the Hindu faith. Accordingly, his last rites were performed at an electric crematorium in Bombay's Sonapur locality by his son Vishwas the following day.

There was no official mourning by the then Congress party government of Maharashtra or at the centre. No minister of Maharashtra Cabinet showed up to pay homage to Savarkar.

The political indifference to Savarkar have continued also after his death.

After the death of Nehru, the Congress government, under Prime Minister Shastri, started to pay him a monthly pension.

Religious and political views

Hindutva 

 
In contrast with Dayananda Saraswati, Swami Vivekananda and Sri Aurobindo, who were "men of religion" who introduced reforms in the society and put Hinduism in front of the world, Savarkar mixed politics and religion and started an extreme form of Hindu nationalism.

During his incarceration, Savarkar's views began turning increasingly towards Hindu cultural and political nationalism, and the next phase of his life remained dedicated to this cause. In the brief period he spent at the Ratnagiri jail, Savarkar wrote his ideological treatise – Hindutva: Who is a Hindu?. Smuggled out of the prison, it was published by Savarkar's supporters under his alias "Maharatta." In this work, Savarkar promotes a farsighted new vision of Hindu social and political consciousness. Savarkar began describing a "Hindu" as a patriotic inhabitant of Bharatavarsha, venturing beyond a religious identity. While emphasising the need for patriotic and social unity of all Hindu communities, he described Hinduism, Jainism, Sikhism and Buddhism as one and the same. He outlined his vision of a "Hindu Rashtra" (Hindu Nation) as "Akhand Bharat" (United India), purportedly stretching across the entire Indian subcontinent. He defined Hindus as being neither Aryan nor Dravidian but as "People who live as children of a common motherland, adoring a common holyland."

According to Sharma, Savarkar's celebration and justification of violence against [British] women and children in his description of the Mutiny of 1857, "transformed Hindutva into the very image of Islam that he defined and found so intolerably objectionable".

Scholars, historians and Indian politicians have been divided in their interpretation of Savarkar's ideas. A self-described atheist, Savarkar regards being Hindu as a cultural and political identity. He often stressed social and community unity between Hindus, Sikhs, Buddhists and Jains, to the exclusion of Muslims and Christians. Savarkar saw Muslims and Christians as "misfits" in the Indian civilization who could not truly be a part of the nation. He argued that the holiest sites of Islam and Christianity are in the Middle East and not India, hence the loyalty of Muslims and Christians to India is divided.

After his release from jail on 6 January 1924, Savarkar helped found the Ratnagiri Hindu Sabha organisation, aiming to work for the social and cultural preservation of Hindu heritage and civilisation.

Focusing his energies on writing, Savarkar authored the Hindu Pad-pada-shahi – a book documenting the Maratha empire – and My Transportation for Life – an account of his early revolutionary days, arrest, trial and incarceration. He also wrote and published a collection of poems, plays and novels. He also wrote a book named Majhi Janmathep ("My Life-term") about his experience in Andaman prison.

Hindu orthodoxy 
He was an ardent critique of Hindu religious practices he saw as irrational and viewed them as a hindrance to the material progress of the Hindus. He believed that religion is an unimportant aspect of "Hindu identity". He was strictly against the caste system and in his 1931 essay titled Seven Shackles of the Hindu Society, he wrote "One of the most important components of such injunctions of the past that we have blindly carried on and which deserves to be thrown in the dustbins of history is the rigid caste system".

Fascism 

In a speech before a 20,000 strong audience at Pune on 1 August 1938, Savarkar stood by Germany's right to Nazism and Italy's to Fascism; their achievement of unprecedent glory in the world-stage and a successful inculcation of national solidarity justified those choices. Savarkar criticized Nehru for denouncing Germany and Italy, proclaiming that "crores of Hindu Sanghatanists in India [..] cherish[ed] no ill-will towards Germany or Italy or Japan." He proclaimed his support for the German occupation of Czechoslovakia in the same breath.

As World War II become imminent, Savarkar had initially advocated a policy of neutralism centered on India's geostrategic equations but his rhetoric grew coarser with time and he expressed consistent support for Hitler's policy about Jews. In a speech on October 14, it was suggested that Hitler's ways be adopted for dealing with Indian Muslims. On December 11, he characterized the Jews as a communal force. Next March, Savarkar would welcome Germany's revival of Aryan culture, their glorification of Swastika, and the "crusade" against Aryan enemies — it was hoped that German victory would finally invigorate the Hindus of India.

On 5 August 1939, Savarkar highlighted how a common strand of "thought, religion, language, and culture" was essential to nationality thus preventing the Germans and Jews from being considerable as one nation. By the year end, he was directly equating the Muslims of India with German Jews — in the words of Chetan Bhatt, both were suspected of harboring extra-national loyalties and became illegitimate presences in an organic nation. These speeches circulated in German newspapers with Nazi Germany even allotting a point-of-contact person for engaging with Savarkar, who was making sincere efforts to forge a working relationship with the Nazis. Eventually, Savarkar would be gifted with a copy of Mein Kampf.

In 1941, Savarkar supported Jews resettling their fatherland of Israel, in what he believed would defend the world against Islamic aggression. It remains unknown whether Savarkar withdrew his support for Nazi Germany after the Holocaust became common knowledge. However, on 15 January 1961 he had spoken favorably of Hitler's Nazism against Nehru's "cowardly democracy".

Muslims 

In his earlier writings, Savarkar argued for "Indian independence from British rule", whereas in later writings he focused on "Hindu independence from Christians and Muslims". In his 1909 book The Indian War of Independence, Savarkar emphasizes Hindu-Muslim unity, stating that they worked together for "freeing their country" during the 1857 uprising. In his introduction to the book, Savarkar states that the feeling of hatred against the Muslims was necessary during Shivaji's period, but it would be "unust and foolish" to nurse such hatred now.

By 1923, when his Essentials of Hindutva was published, Savarkar no longer emphasized the Hindu-Muslim unity, and primarily focused on "Hindus" rather than "Indians". His writings on Hindutva emerged immediately after he was moved from the Cellular Jail to a prison in Ratnagiri in 1921, and therefore, later scholars have speculated if his stay in these prisons contributed to a change in his views. These scholars point to Savarkar's claims that the Muslim warders at the Cellular Jail treated the Muslim prisoners favourably, while mistreating Hindus; the pan-Islamic Khilafat Movement may have also influenced his views about Muslims while he stayed at Ratnagiri during 1921–1923. According to Bhai Parmanand, his fellow prisoner at the Cellular Jail during 1915–1920, Savarkar had already formed his ideas about Hindutva before they met.

Subsequently, Savarkar was known for his anti-Muslim writings. Historians including Rachel McDermott, Leonard A. Gordon, Ainslie Embree, Frances Pritchett and Dennis Dalton state that Savarkar promoted an anti-Muslim form of Hindu nationalism.

Savarkar saw Muslims in the Indian police and military to be "potential traitors". He advocated that India reduce the number of Muslims in the military, police and public service and ban Muslims from owning or working in munitions factories. Savarkar criticized Gandhi for being concerned about Indian Muslims.

In the 1940s, the two-nation theory was supported by Muhammad Ali Jinnah and Savarkar, additionally Savarkar also urged Sikhs to establish an independent "Sikhistan". While Jinnah supported a separate country for Muslims as a part of this theory, Savarkar wanted both religions in the same country where the Muslims lived in a subordinate position to the Hindus.

In his 1963 book Six Glorious Epochs of Indian History, Savarkar says Muslims and Christians wanted to "destroy" Hinduism.

Women 

Historian Vinayak Chaturvedi writes that in a 1937 speech Savarkar said that "Kitchen and children were the main duties of women" and suggested that they have healthy children. Unlike Tilak who said that women should not be allowed education at all as reading may make them "immoral" and "insubordinate", Savarkar held a less extreme view. Savarkar did not oppose education of women but suggested that the education  focus on how they could be good mothers and create a generation of patriotic children. In an essay, "Women's beauty and duty", he stated that a woman's main duty was to her children, her home and her country. As per Savarkar, any woman digressing from her domestic  duties was "morally guilty of breach of trust".

In his 1963 book Six Glorious Epochs of Indian History, Savarkar advocated use of rape as political tool. He accused Muslim women of actively supporting Muslim men's atrocities against Hindu women, Savarkar wrote that young and beautiful Muslim girls should be captured, converted and presented to Maratha warriors to reward them, stating that the Muslim ruler Tipu Sultan had similarly distributed Hindu girls among his warriors. He further wrote:
"Let the sultans and their peers take a pledge that in the event of a Hindu victory our molestation and detestable lot shall be avenged on the Muslim women. Once they are haunted with this dreadful apprehension that the Muslim women too, stand in the same predicament in the case the Hindus win, the future Muslim conquerors will never dare to think of such molestation of Hindu women."

British women and children victims in 1857 mutiny

As per Sharma, based on Swami Ramdas's teaching, Savarkar justifies the killing of countless British women and children in 1857. Sharma has translated some passages from "Savarkar Samgraha" which is originally in Savarkar's native language into English to give examples.

In Jhansi, 12  women along with 23  children and 75 men were killed. Savarkar calls this killing of the British whites as a Bali or "Holy Sacrifice".

On page 202 of Volume 5, Savarkar Samgraha, in his native language, Savarkar writes(translated by Sharma):

When some men, women and children were killed in the Ganga river, Savarkar describes this as a "celebration" of the anniversary of plassey on page 196.

In Kanpur, when 150 children and women were killed he quotes unemotionally as per Sharma in his native language that a the butchers entered Bibigarh ..and sea of white blood spread all over'''.

In another incident on 16 May, Savarkar describes the fate of English women and children as follows:

 Legacy 

He is known among followers by the honorific prefix Veer meaning "brave". The airport at Port Blair, Andaman and Nicobar's capital was renamed Veer Savarkar International Airport in 2002. One of the commemorative blue plaques affixed on India House fixed by the Historic Building and Monuments Commission for England reads "Vinayak Damodar Savarkar, 1883–1966, Indian patriot and philosopher lived here".

 A commemorative postage stamp was released by government of India in 1970.

 A portrait of Savarkar was unveiled in the Indian Parliament in 2003.
 The Shiv Sena party has demanded that the Indian Government posthumously confer upon him India's highest civilian award, the Bharat Ratna. Uddhav Thackeray, Shiv Sena chief, while reiterating this demand for Bharat Ratna in 2017, has also suggested that a replica of the prison cell where Savarkar was imprisoned should be built in Mumbai and the youth should be educated about Savarkar's contribution towards the 'Hindu Rashtra' and the Indian freedom struggle.

In 1926, two years after the release of Savarkar from the prison, a biography titled "Life of Barrister Savarkar" and authored by a certain "Chitragupta" was published. A revised version was published in 1939 with additions by Indra Prakash of the Hindu Mahasabha. A second edition of the book was published in 1987 by Veer Savarkar Prakashan, the official publisher of writings by Savarkar. In its preface, Ravindra Vaman Ramdas deduced that, "Chitragupta is none other than Veer Savarkar".

 In popular culture 

In the 1996 Malayalam movie Kaalapani directed by Priyadarshan, the Hindi actor Annu Kapoor played the role of Savarkar.
 The Marathi and Hindi music director and Savarkar follower, Sudhir Phadke, and Ved Rahi made the biopic film Veer Savarkar, which was released in 2001 after many years in production. Savarkar is portrayed by Shailendra Gaur.
The 2015 Indian Marathi-language film What About Savarkar?, directed by Rupesh Katare and Nitin Gawde, depicted the journey of a man's revenge against those who have disrespect Savarkar's name.

Books
He wrote 38 books in English and Marathi, consisting in many essays, two novels called Moplah Rebellion and the Transportation, poetry and plays, the best-known of his books being his historical study The Indian war of independence, 1857 and his pamphlet Hindutva: Who Is a Hindu?''.

Notes

Citations

Bibliography

Further reading

External links 

 Official Website of Savarkar National Memorial
 Savarkar's Hindu Pad-pada-shahi

 
Indian independence activists from Maharashtra
Marathi people
Marathi-language writers
Marathi-language poets
Hindutva
Hindu revivalist writers
India House
People acquitted of murder
Deaths by euthanasia
1883 births
1966 deaths
Indian atheists
Indian Hindus
Indian prisoners sentenced to life imprisonment
Prisoners and detainees of British India
20th-century Indian philosophers
Indian revolutionaries
Hindu Mahasabha politicians
20th-century Indian poets
Indian male poets
20th-century Indian dramatists and playwrights
Indian male dramatists and playwrights
People from Maharashtra
Poets from Maharashtra
19th-century Indian male writers
Presidents of the Akhil Bharatiya Marathi Sahitya Sammelan
Mahatma Gandhi assassination conspirators
Indian independence armed struggle activists
Indian political philosophers